Club Deportivo Bupolsa, is a Spanish football club from Burgos. It currently plays in Tercera División – Group 8.

History
Founded in 2006 as CD Estructuras Tino, it started playing its games in Melgar de Fernamental. In 2010 the club was moved to Burgos for working as the farm club of Burgos CF and changed its name in 2011 to CD Burgos.

In 2012 the collaboration with Burgos CF ended and CD Burgos continued playing as an independent club.

In 2014 it changed officially its name to Club Deportivo Beroil Bupolsa, its two main sponsors. Two years later, as Beroil retires its sponsorship, the club changes again its name to Club Deportivo Bupolsa.

Club background
CD Estructuras Tino (2006–2010)
CD Burgos CF (2011–2014)
CD Beroil Bupolsa (2014–2016)
CD Bupolsa (2016–2022)
CD Burgalés (2022–present)

Season to season

8 seasons in Tercera División

References

External links
Official website  
Futbolme.com profile 

Sport in Burgos
Association football clubs established in 2006
Divisiones Regionales de Fútbol clubs
2006 establishments in Spain
Football clubs in Castile and León